Theophilus Gould Steward (April 17, 1843 – January 11, 1924) was an American author, educator, and clergyman. He was a U.S. Army chaplain and Buffalo Soldier of 25th U.S. Colored Infantry.

Life and career

Early years
Steward was born to James Steward and Rebecca Gould in Gouldtown, New Jersey. The son of free Blacks reared in a family that stressed education, he received his formal education in the Gouldtown public schools.

Career
Steward was ordained a minister in the African Methodist Episcopal Church in 1863. Following the Civil War, Steward helped organize the A.M.E. Church in South Carolina and Georgia. He was also active in Reconstruction politics in Georgia. Steward moved from South Carolina to pastor the AME church in Macon, Georgia March 17, 1868. After the church was burned in a mysterious fire, he literally and figuratively built a new AME church. The cornerstone was laid January 16, 1870 in the presence of 2,000 black Maconites. After the war he graduated from the Episcopal Divinity School of Philadelphia, and later was awarded a Doctor of Divinity degree from Wilberforce University in Wilberforce, Ohio, in 1881.

From 1872 to 1891 Steward established a church in Haiti and preached in the eastern United States. In 1891 he joined the 25th U.S. Colored Infantry, serving as its chaplain until 1907, including service in Cuba during the Spanish–American War, and in the Philippines. He was a participant in the March 5, 1897 meeting to celebrate the memory of Frederick Douglass which founded the American Negro Academy led by Alexander Crummell. From the founding of the organization until his death in 1924, Steward remained active among the scholars, editors, and activists of this first major African American learned society, refuting racist scholarship, promoting black claims to individual, social, and political equality, and studying the history and sociology of African American life.  Between 1907 and his death on January 11, 1924, Steward was a professor of history, French, and logic at Wilberforce University.

Personal life
Steward was married to Elizabeth Gadsden (d. 1893) with whom he had eight sons: Frank Rudolph (b. 1872; Stephen Hunter (b. 1874), Theophilus Bolden (b. 1879), Charles, James, Benjamin, Walter, and Gustavus (b. 1883). His second wife was Dr. Susan Smith McKinney, the third African-American physician in the United States. He was a cousin to African Methodist Episcopal Church (AME) bishop Benjamin F. Lee.

Bibliography

Steward, T.G. (1888). The End of the World; or, Clearing the Way for the Fullness of the Gentiles. Philadelphia: A.M.E. Church Book Rooms. OCLC 4090482.

See also

African-American firsts

References

External links

 
 
 A Charleston Love Story hypertext from American Studies at the University of Virginia
 

1843 births
1924 deaths
19th-century American novelists
19th-century Methodist ministers
20th-century American novelists
African-American academics
African Methodist Episcopal Church clergy
African-American non-fiction writers
African-American novelists
American male novelists
Buffalo Soldiers
People from Fairfield Township, Cumberland County, New Jersey
Spanish–American War chaplains
United States Army chaplains
United States Army officers
Wilberforce University alumni
Wilberforce University faculty
Novelists from New Jersey
19th-century American male writers
20th-century American male writers
20th-century American non-fiction writers
American male non-fiction writers